Fawazeer Ramadan was an Egyptian television show broadcast during the month of Ramadan. It involved riddles (fawazeer) presented in musical form, with awards given out to the winners. The show began in the 1960s and lasted until the year 2000, being broadcast irregularly. Many prominent Egyptian actors and entertainers participated in the show, most notably Sherihan, Fouad el-Mohandes, Nelly, and the Tholathy Adwa'a El Masrah trio. Sherihan's performances in particular have had a strong cultural influence in the Arabic-speaking world.

References

Egyptian television series
Ramadan